Tarik Filipović (born 11 March 1972) is a Bosnian-Croatian television presenter and actor. He has appeared in over 800 theatre plays since his debut in 1985. He has also been in many films and TV dramas produced throughout the areas of former Yugoslavia.

He presents quiz shows Tko želi biti milijunaš? (Croatia's Who Wants to Be a Millionaire?) on Croatian Radiotelevision, and Potjera (Croatia's The Chase) on HRT1. In 2001, Filipović starred in Behind Enemy Lines as a Serbian soldier.

Personal life
Filipović is married to Lejla Šehović with whom he has one son, Arman. He is tbe stepfather to her son Dino Majoli form her previous marriage to Dado Majoli. He is also a supporter of NK Čelik Zenica.

Apart from Čelik, he is a supporter of GNK Dinamo Zagreb.

Filmography

Film

Television

As television host

References

External links

Living people
1972 births
20th-century Croatian male actors
Croatian male film actors
Croatian male stage actors
People from Zenica
Bosniaks of Croatia
Bosniaks of Bosnia and Herzegovina
Croatian game show hosts
Bosnia and Herzegovina male actors
21st-century Croatian male actors
Bosnian expatriate actors in Croatia